Gamba may be:

Ngambay language of Chad
Belanda Viri language of South Sudan